Laure Lavalette (born 11 April 1976) is a French lawyer and politician affiliated with the National Rally.

Since 2022, she has been a Member of the National Assembly representing Var's 2nd constituency.

Education and personal life
Lavelette was born and spent her youth in Paris. She trained and practised as a lawyer in Bordeaux before moving to Toulon in 1999. However, she left her profession for a period in order to care for one of her children who was born with down's syndrome. She is married to a fisherman and has five children. Lavelette has also described herself as a practicing Catholic.

Political career
She first joined the National Front (now National Rally) in 1997 and unsuccessfully stood for the party in the regional elections of that year in Bègles. In 1999, she defected to the National Republican Movement formed by former National Front politician Bruno Mégret but subsequently returned to the National Front.

Lavelette was elected municipal councillor within the opposition in Toulon in 2014 then regional councilor in Provence-Alpes-Côte d'Azur in June 2021.

During the 2022 French legislative election Lavelette contested Var's 2nd Constituency and was elected defeating incumbent deputy Cécile Muschotti.

Positions
Lavelette has campaigned in support of pro-life messages. In 2014, she signed a text asking local elected officials to support for the senatorial or presidential elections, the candidates committing, among other things, to "repeal, in the long term, the right to abortion." During her 2015 campaign in Provence-Alpes-Côte d'Azur, she supported the abolition of family planning public subsidies in the event of victory, the message on which Marion Maréchal campaigned.

In 2022, she expressed opposition to proposals by the LREM led government to extend the abortion period in France.

However, that same year Lavelette stated that she did not support banning abortion in France, claiming "at no time did I question the right to abortion" and added that repealing the Veil Law was "not a political objective" for her.

References

1974 births
Living people
21st-century French politicians
21st-century French women politicians
Politicians from Paris
National Rally (France) politicians
Deputies of the 16th National Assembly of the French Fifth Republic
French Catholics
Women members of the National Assembly (France)